Brodhead may refer to:

People 
 Brodhead (surname)

Places 
 Brodhead, Colorado, a US ghost town
 Brodhead, Kentucky, a US city
 Brodhead, Wisconsin, a US city
 Brodhead Creek, a Pennsylvania stream
 A hamlet in the town of Olive, New York.

See also 
Broadhead (disambiguation)